The Siemens-Schuckert B was an unarmed German two seat reconnaissance biplane built early in World War I.  A single example was delivered but soon lost.

Design and development
The two seat unarmed B was built in 1915 for reconnaissance duties.  It was an equal span, two bay biplane, with straight edged, constant chord wings mounted without stagger. Unusually, the wing spars were made from tubular steel. The wings had parallel pairs of interplane struts, the inner ones with additional diagonal strut cross bracing, and bays laterally conventionally braced with diagonal flying wires. The lower wing was joined to the lower fuselage longerons and the upper wing supported over the fuselage on a pair of outward leaning N-form struts from the upper fuselage; a fully semi-circular cut-out in the upper trailing edge improved the pilot's upward vision.

The B was powered by a  Siemens-Halske Sh.I nine cylinder rotary engine, driving a two blade propeller and housed within a partially enclosing, oil deflecting cowling.  Behind it the fuselage was flat sided. The aircraft had a conventional undercarriage with mainwheels on a single axle supported on V-form struts.

The sole B built was delivered to the communications centre at Ostend.  After it crashed there some parts were retrieved and used by Siemens-Schuckert in the construction of the E.II monoplane.

Specifications (before reconstruction)

References

Biplanes
1910s German military reconnaissance aircraft
B
Single-engined tractor aircraft
Aircraft first flown in 1915